Plain wren has been split into the following species:

 Cabanis's wren, Cantorchilus modestus
 Canebrake wren, Cantorchilus zeledoni
 Isthmian wren, Cantorchilus elutus

Birds by common name